The optical window is a range of wavelengths that are not blocked by the earth's atmosphere. The window runs from around 300 nanometers (ultraviolet-B) up into the range the human eye can detect, roughly 400–700 nm and continues up to approximately 2 μm. Sunlight mostly reaches the ground through the optical atmospheric window; the sun is particularly active in most of this range (44% of the radiation emitted by the sun falls within the visible spectrum and 49% falls within the infrared spectrum).

Definition
The earth's atmosphere is not totally transparent and is in fact 100% opaque to many wavelengths (see plot of Earth's opacity); the wavelength ranges to which it is transparent are called atmospheric windows.

Disambiguation of the term 'optical spectrum' 
Although the word optical, deriving from Ancient Greek ὀπτῐκός (optikós, “of or for sight”), generally refers to something visible or visual, the term optical spectrum is used to describe the sum of the visible, the ultraviolet and the infrared spectra (at least in this context).

The optical atmospheric window 

The optical atmospheric window is the optical portion of the electromagnetic spectrum that passes through the earth's atmosphere, excluding the infrared window; although, as mentioned before, the optical spectrum also includes the IR spectrum and thus the optical window should include the infrared window (8 – 14 μm), the latter is considered separate by convention, since the visible spectrum is not contained in it.

Historical importance for observational astronomy 
Up until the 1940s, astronomers could only use the visible and near infrared portions of the optical window for their observations. The first great astronomical discoveries such as the ones made by the famous Italian polymath Galileo Galilei were made using optical telescopes that received light reaching the ground through the optical window. After the 1940s, the development of radio telescopes gave rise to the even more successful field of radio astronomy that utilized the radio window.

See also
Infrared (atmospheric) window
Optical window in biological tissue
Radio window

References

Electromagnetic spectrum
Observational astronomy